Artington is a village and civil parish in the borough of Guildford, Surrey, England. It covers the area from the southern edge of the built-up centre of Guildford and steep Guildown, the start of the Hog's Back and part of the North Downs AONB, to New Pond Farm by Godalming and the edge of Peasmarsh. It contains Loseley Park, a country estate with dairy, and the hamlet of Littleton.

Geography and history
It is crossed by the North Downs Way and Portsmouth Road. A holy well lies by the ford, while the ruins of the 13th-century St Catherine's Chapel, Guildford lie just above Portsmouth Road, the main route south.

To the west and also directly south of the Pilgrims' Way are listed Braboeuf Manor (University of Law, Guildford), the manor house of which was rebuilt in the late 16th-century, its front dating to the 19th-century, and Mount Browne Surrey Police training headquarters. The 2011 census gave a population of 359 for the parish, an increase of 35 over 10 years, more than 10%.

Manors
Artington Manor was granted to the More family, later the More-Molyneux family who still own and run Loseley Park. Artington Manor Farm was the manor house, and underwent reconstruction mostly during the 18th century; it is architecturally Grade II listed. The estate is open for tours.

Braboeuf Manor is a campus of The College of Law mentioned above and, having much greater lands, including Millmead, Guildford, was held first by Stephen de Turnham, assigning part to his daughter Alice de Bendeng then was held for centuries by various listed descendants named de Braboeuf, then further named family relatives.

Former extent
Until shortly after 1911, the area extended over the Guildown and into Guildford Park, the area around Guildford railway station in the north and the Hog's Back marked the southern limits of Windsor Great Park, the main royal demesne in England.

Transport

Artington has at its periphery on the Portsmouth Road the first purpose-built park and ride facility in Guildford, initially operating from a temporary car park, but later being expanded into a permanent car park with waiting room.

In 2011, 26 people commuted to work by public transport (an increase from 15 in the previous census), with 98 taking motor vehicles and 35 travelling by other means or working from home.

Guildford Railway station is on the same bank directly in Guildford town centre and Shalford railway station (with Reading to Gatwick Airport trains) lies less than 300m east of the eastern boundary.

Amenities
The place is beholden on adjoining Guildford for most of its amenities, other than the farm produce of the Loseley estate, for instance, it has no functional church within its bounds. The United Reformed Church operates on Portsmouth Road just north of its border and the Church of St Nicholas, Guildford has a church parish that extends into the area in Anglicanism, the civil parish is also partly within St Michael's church Peasmarsh's purview.

Localities

Littleton
Littleton is the western settlement between Guildown hill to the north and Godalming to the south, strung along Littleton Lane.

Littleton is now a hamlet, which consists of Loseley House, Orange Court, Orange Court Farm, and a few cottages.  Due to the ruin of St Catherine's Chapel mentioned and like the rest of Artington civil parish, it falls within the ecclesiastical parish of St Nicholas, Guildford and the Artington civil parish.

Littleton is home to Loseley Park and Loseley House, a fine Elizabethan stately home built in 1562 by Sir William More (a direct ancestor of the current owner) at the request of Queen Elizabeth I.

Loseley
Loseley was recorded separately in the Domesday Book but owing to its park (in other words enclosure) for many centuries of Loseley House it did not experience significant population growth. At Domesday it was held of Earl Roger of Shrewsbury, as tenant-in-chief, by Turold nephew of Wigot, its adult householders comprised 7 [male] villagers, 2 slaves and 1 [male] cottager.

Demography and housing
The proportion of households in Artington who owned their home outright was 7.3% below the regional average.  The proportion who owned their home with a loan was 5.8% lower than the regional average; providing overall a greater proportion than average of rented residential property relative to the average in Surrey, the district and the national average.

The average level of accommodation in the region composed of detached houses was 28%, the average that was apartments was 22.6%.

Famous Residents
Mount Browne was home to the Dowager Marchioness of Sligo.

Politics
Artington is in Guildford, which since its inception has fluctuated between political parties. Local government is administered by Guildford Borough Council and Surrey County Council.

At Surrey County Council, one of the 81 representatives represents the area within the Shalford division.

At Guildford Borough Council small wards of the borough are deemed appropriate to be best represented under the current constitution of councillors by two councillors.

Notes and references
Notes 
  
References

External links

Villages in Surrey
Borough of Guildford
Civil parishes in Surrey
Holy wells in England